Jean-Claude Van Geenberghe (17 November 1962 – 9 May 2009) was a Belgian-Ukrainian equestrian who competed in the sport of show jumping. He competed in the 1998, 1992, and 2008 Summer Olympics.

While competing for Ukraine, Van Geenberghe resided in Donetsk. He died from heart attack and is buried in Belgium.

References

External links
Official website

1962 births
2009 deaths
Belgian male equestrians
Equestrians at the 1988 Summer Olympics
Equestrians at the 1992 Summer Olympics
Equestrians at the 2008 Summer Olympics
Flemish sportspeople
Olympic equestrians of Belgium
Olympic equestrians of Ukraine
Show jumping riders
Ukrainian male equestrians
Sportspeople from Kortrijk
Belgian emigrants to Ukraine
Naturalized citizens of Ukraine